Simanggang is a town and the capital of Sri Aman District and Sri Aman Division in Sarawak, east Malaysia. It is a trade center for the timber, oil palm, rubber, and pepper of its mostly agricultural district.

Simanggang is famous for the benak, or tidal bore, of the Batang Lupar River. The tidal bore comes in from the river mouth and fills up the river very rapidly in the course of about 10 minutes. This is one of approximately 48 rivers and estuaries in the world where this phenomenon happens. What is special about Simanggang's benak is that it occurs every day, the only river in the world that does that.

There is a timetable at the river which has the time and dates for when the tidal bore will occur, but the really big ones occur only a couple of times a year. The author Somerset Maugham almost died at Simanggang during one of these tidal bores, an event commemorated the event in his short story The Yellow Streak.

Simanggang is also a gateway for tourists to the Batang Ai National Park, and cultural tours to the Iban longhouses along the rivers.

Etymology
The town of Simanggang was known for the same name until 1973. Following the memorandum of understanding (MoU) signed in October 1973 between government of Sarawak and Communist members to end the armed conflict in southern Sarawak, the name of the town was changed to "Sri Aman" while the administrative division was renamed as Sri Aman Division in March 1974. Sri Aman  means "town of peace" in the Malay language. In 2019, the town reverted to its old name "Simanggang" according to the wishes of the local residents. However, the administrative division retains its "Sri Aman" name.

History

Geography
Simanggang has a tropical rainforest climate (Af) with heavy to very heavy rainfall year-round.

Demography

According to the 2010 Malaysian census, Sri Aman has a total population of 64,500. Indigenous people form the largest ethnic group in the city which consists of Iban , Malay, other indigenous tribes. This is followed by Chinese, non-Malaysians Indians, and Others.

Transport

Local Bus or Bus Express remain unclear

Other utilities

Education

Secondary school
SMK St Luke (M)
SMK Sri Aman
SMK Simanggang
SMK Melugu
SMK ENGKILILI
SMK LUBOK ANTU
SMK LINGGA

Primary school
SK Abang Aing
SK Melugu
SK Temudok Kem Pakit
SJK (C) Chung Hua Undop
SJK (C) Chung Hua Simanggang
SJK (C) Chung Hua Pantu
SJK (C) Chung Hua Lingga
SJK (C) Chung Hua Bangkong
SK St Lawrence Sabu
SK Sri Aman
SK Selepong
SK Engkilili

Healthcare

Sri Aman II hospital started operation since September 2022.

Leisure and conservation areas

Fort Alice

Fort Alice, built in 1864, is the oldest heritage building in Simanggang, constructed following the victory of Rajah Charles Brooke, the second Rajah of Sarawak, over Rentap, the last of the major Iban chieftains, in 1864. The Fort was named after Charles Brooke's wife, Margaret Alice Lili de Windt. It served as a defensive structure controlling the Lupar River.

The structure was built on a strategic hilltop position and had a  commanding view of the river with cannons bearing down to stop any threats coming from upriver. It played a major role in suppressing piracy, slavery, and head-hunting, while encouraging trade and expanding the authority of the Rajah. Fort Alice was the Simanggang administrative center, housing various government departments and even a prison.

It was here Rajah Charles used to preside as judge settling disputes among the local Ibans during his many visits to Simanggang. It was built entirely of belian (ironwood) timber. Much of the timber used was taken from an earlier fort, Fort James Brooke, which had been built further upriver in Nanga Skrang. However, Fort James was built on lowland and was hard to defend, as was proven in 1853 when one of the Rajah's officers, Alan Lee, died in an attack by the Iban chieftain Rentap.

It was decided to dismantle Fort James and to rebuild it in a more strategic and more defensible site in Simanggang District (now Sri Aman Division). Thus Fort Alice was built. Most of the original structure remains substantially intact, but it is in an extremely dilapidated and run down condition and in need of urgent restoration work. Many articles have been written to highlight the sorry state of the grand old lady. Restoration for the fort had been done in April 2015 and been changed into a museum.

Notes

Sri Aman District
Towns in Sarawak
Tidal bores